Anton Chico, or Anton Chico Abajo or Anton Chico de Abajo, is a census-designated place in Guadalupe County, New Mexico, United States. Its population was 188 as of the 2010 census, of which 167 were Hispanic in origin. Anton Chico has a post office with ZIP code 87711. New Mexico State Road 386 passes through the community. Anton Chico is listed in the National Register of Historic Places.

Geography

In 1958 tin roofs rather than adobe were on the majority of houses.

Demographics

History
Prior to 1786, when a peace treaty was concluded with the Comanches, Spanish settlements in New Mexico were confined to the Rio Grande valley and nearby. The reduced threat from the Comanches, the most numerous and dangerous of the Indian peoples surrounding the New Mexican settlements, permitted the expansion of the Spanish eastward into the Pecos River valley and onto the Great Plains.  The motivation for the Pecos Valley settlements was the growing population of New Mexico plus the need to defend the Spanish and Puebloan settlements in the Rio Grande valley from raids by Apache and other Indian peoples.

In 1822 the government of New Mexico created the Anton Chico Land Grant, 378,537 acres (153,188 ha) in size. Salvador Tapia and 36 others petitioned the government for the grant. In exchange they promised to take up residence in the grant area, to hold the land in common for themselves and future settlers, and to obtain firearms and bows and arrows to defend the settlement against Indian attacks. However, Indian raids caused the abandonment of the settlement in 1827. Anton Chico was resettled in 1834, this time with success

Seven settlements grew along  of the Pecos River.  From north to south (upstream to downstream) they were Tecolotito, Upper Anton Chico, Anton Chico, Llano Viejo, La Loma, Llano del Medio, Dilia, and Colonias. Anton Chico is the largest settlement of the seven. It was described in 1841-1842 as having a population of 200 to 300 people and built around a plaza designed for defense. The houses, surrounded by high walls, were described as follows:

As one of the closest New Mexican settlements to the Great Plains with its bison herds and Plains Indians, many Ciboleros (bison hunters) and Comancheros (traders with the Plains Indians) originated from Anton Chico and other Hispano communities along the Pecos River in the 19th century.

Anton Chico achieved its maximum prominence about 1890 when it had a population of 900 people, all or nearly all Hispanic, and was a mercantile center for much of eastern New Mexico. Subsequently, with out-migration the population and economic activity declined. A factor in its decline was the re-routing of Route 66 which before 1937 crossed the Pecos River near Anton Chico.  Subsequently, Anton Chico was distant from major transportation routes.

Climate
Anton Chico has a cold steppe climate (BSk) under the Köppen Classification of climates. Under the Trewartha climate classification the climate is a cold steppe with hot summers and cool winters (BSak). Most precipitation is received in the warmer six months of the year.

National Register of Historic Places
In 1986, the village of Anton Chico was added to the National Register of Historic Places.

Education
Its school district is Santa Rosa Consolidated Schools. It operates Rita M. Marquez Elementary School and Anton Chico Middle School in Anton Chico. Santa Rosa High School is the district's sole comprehensive high school.

Prior to 1973 the school district closed the junior high school in the Anton Chico area and began sending middle school students to Santa Rosa. This in turn made the Anton Chico residents upset at the school district. The West Las Vegas School District offered to have school bus transportation from Anton Chico to its schools and asked the State of New Mexico to pay for the transportation costs, but in 1973 the New Mexico State Board of Education denied the request to pay. In 1973 the Anton Chico elementary, which covered Kindergarten through grade 6, had 154 students.

References

External links
 A Brief History of the Anton Chico Land Grant by Severiano R. Sisneros Jr., Secretary/Treasurer @New Mexico Legislature

Census-designated places in New Mexico
Census-designated places in Guadalupe County, New Mexico
Populated places established in 1834
National Register of Historic Places in Guadalupe County, New Mexico
1834 establishments in Mexico